Mary Margaret Anne McCabe  (born 18 December 1948), known as M. M. McCabe, is emerita professor of ancient philosophy at King's College London. She has written   books on Plato and other ancient philosophers, including the pre-Socratics, Socrates and Aristotle.

Early life 
McCabe was educated at Oxford High School for Girls, and then studied at Newnham College, University of Cambridge, taking her Bachelor of Arts degree in 1970 and her Doctor of Philosophy degree in 1977 in classics. Her doctoral thesis, Plato's Theory of Punishment and Its Antecedents, formed the basis of her first book, Plato on Punishment, published in 1981.

Academic career 
From 1981 to 1990 McCabe was Fellow in Classics at New Hall, University of Cambridge. She joined King's College London in 1990 and retired from her chair in Ancient Philosophy in 2014. She is now Keeling Scholar and Honorary Professor in Philosophy at University College London, and a Bye-Fellow of Newnham College, Cambridge.

In 2017 McCabe gave the Sather Lectures at the University of California, Berkeley, on the subject of 'Seeing and Saying: Plato on Virtue and Knowledge'.

McCabe was president of the British Philosophical Association from 2009 to 2012, and president of the Mind Association in 2016–2017.

In July 2017, McCabe was elected a Fellow of the British Academy (FBA), the United Kingdom's national academy for the humanities and social sciences.

Selected works

Books 
Plato on Punishment (1981)Plato's Individuals (1994)Plato and His Predecessors: The Dramatisation of Reason (2007)Platonic Conversations (2015)

Edited volumes 
Form and Argument in Late Plato (2000), co-edited with Christopher GillPerspectives on Perception: A Collection of Essays, (2007) co-edited with Mark TextorAristotle and the Stoics Reading Plato (2010), co-edited with Verity Harte, R. W. Sharples and Anne Sheppard

Articles and book chapters 

 'Silencing the Sophists: The Drama of Plato's Euthydemus' (1998), Proceedings of the Boston Area Colloquium of Ancient Philosophy,Vol. 14, pp. 139–68
 'Looking inside Charmides' Cloak' (2007), in Maieusis, ed. Dominic Scott, Oxford University Press, pp. 1–19
 'Escaping One's Own Notice Knowing: Meno's Paradox Again' (2009), in Proceedings of the Aristotelian Society. Vol. 109, 1, pp. 233–256
 'The Stoic Sage in the Original Position' (2013), in Politeia in Greek and Roman Philosophy, ed. Verity Harte and Melissa Lane, pp. 251–274
 'The Unity of Virtue: Plato's Models of Philosophy' (2016), Aristotelian Society Supplementary Volume 90 (1), pp. 1–25

References

External links 
 Staff profile at King's College London
 M.M. McCabe on the Paradox of Inquiry, an interview with Philosophy Bites
 

British women philosophers
Commentators on Plato
20th-century British philosophers
21st-century British philosophers
British scholars of ancient Greek philosophy
Living people
Academics of King's College London
Fellows of New Hall, Cambridge
Members of the University of Cambridge faculty of classics
Fellows of the British Academy
1948 births
Women classical scholars
British classical scholars